Fredric John Baur (June 14, 1918 – May 4, 2008) was an American organic chemist and food storage scientist notable for designing and patenting the Pringles packaging. Baur filed for a patent for the tubular Pringles container and for the method of packaging the curved, stacked potato chip in the container in 1966, and it was granted in 1971. His other accomplishments included development of frying oils and freeze-dried ice cream. Baur was a graduate of the University of Toledo in Toledo, Ohio, and received both his master's and PhD degrees at Ohio State University. He also served in the U.S. Navy as an aviation physiologist. He was a resident of Cincinnati, Ohio.

Some of Baur's ashes were buried in a Pringles can at his request. Baur's children said they honored his request to bury him in one of the cans by placing part of his cremated remains in an Original flavor Pringles container in his grave in suburban Springfield Township. The rest of his remains were placed in an urn buried along with the can, with some placed in another urn and given to one of Baur's grandchildren.

Bibliography

References

External links

1918 births
2008 deaths
20th-century American chemists
20th-century American engineers
University of Toledo alumni
Organic chemists
Ohio State University alumni